Abdulhashim Mutalovich Mutalov (born February 14, 1947) is an Uzbek politician who served as the first Prime Minister of Uzbekistan from January 1992 to December 1995.

References

See also
 List of national leaders

1946 births
Prime Ministers of Uzbekistan
People from Tashkent Region
Living people